Cluster II is the second full-length album by German electronic music act Cluster, released in 1972 by record label Brain.

Production 

It is their first album with the band reduced to a duo; Conny Plank, who was credited as a member on the first album, decided to concentrate on production and engineering. Plank is still credited as a composer together with Hans-Joachim Roedelius and Dieter Moebius on all tracks.

Cluster II was recorded at Star-Studio in Hamburg, Germany in January 1972.

It was Cluster's first release for legendary krautrock label Brain, a relationship which would last until 1975 and include the subsequent album Zuckerzeit as well as the first two Harmonia albums, a group which included both remaining members of Cluster and Michael Rother of Neu!.

Content 

Cluster II continued the transition away from the discordant, proto-industrial sound of Kluster towards a more electronic sound. It was the first album to feature relatively short tracks and it was the first album in which tracks were named. (Earlier Kluster albums as well as the eponymous first Cluster album had unnamed pieces.)

Release 

The album was first reissued on CD in 1994 on the Spalax label with subsequent reissues on Universal in 2004, Revisited in 2007 and Esoteric in 2012.

Reception 

Julian Cope included Cluster II in his "Krautrock Top 50" list.

Track listing 

All tracks written by Hans-Joachim Roedelius, Dieter Moebius and Conrad Plank.

 Side A

 "Plas" – 6:00
 "Im Süden" – 12:50
 "Für die Katz'" – 3:00

 Side B

 "Live in der Fabrik" – 14:50
 "Georgel" – 5:25
 "Nabitte" – 2:40

Personnel 
 Hans-Joachim Roedelius – electronics
 Dieter Moebius – electric organ, guitars, effects & electronics
 Conrad Plank – producer

Notes

External links 

 
 Prog Archives article on the album
 A Curious History of Cluster

1972 albums
Cluster (band) albums
Albums produced by Conny Plank